Jiara  is a village in Chanditala I community development block of Srirampore subdivision in Hooghly district in the Indian state of West Bengal.

Geography

Gram panchayat
Villages in Ainya gram panchayat are: Akuni, Aniya, Bandpur, Banipur, Bara Choughara, Dudhkanra, Ganeshpur, Goplapur, Jiara, Kalyanbati, Mukundapur, Sadpur and Shyamsundarpur.

Demographics
As per 2011 Census of India Jiara had a total population of 1,150 of which 579 (50%) were males and 571 (50%) were females. Population below 6 years was 125. The total number of literates in Jiara was 841(82.05% of the population over 6 years).

Transport
Baruipara railway station is the nearest railway station.

References 

Villages in Chanditala I CD Block